Meditation or The Interior Voice is an 1886 sculpture by Auguste Rodin, showing a young woman resting her head on her right shoulder.

Versions
The figure was also used on the right end of the tympanum of Rodin's The Gates of Hell, with a right hand added, extended in horror at the fate that awaits her in Hell.

The figure was also used in Rodin's Monument to Victor Hugo, representing one of the poet's muses. For Gates, Rodin cut off its arms, left knee and part of its right leg. He exhibited the plaster as an independent work in 1896.

See also
List of sculptures by Auguste Rodin

References

External links

Sculptures by Auguste Rodin
1886 sculptures
Sculptures of the Museo Soumaya
Sculptures of the Musée Rodin
Plaster sculptures